The 1986 Wyoming gubernatorial election took place on November 4, 1986. Popular three-term Democratic Governor Edgar Herschler announced that he would not seek a fourth term, creating an open seat. Attorney Mike Sullivan emerged as the unlikely Democratic nominee, and faced former State Representative Pete Simpson, the Republican nominee and the brother of then-U.S. Senator Alan K. Simpson, in the general election. Despite Sullivan's political inexperience, he was able to defeat Simpson by a decisive margin, winning his first of two terms in office.

Democratic primary

Candidates
 Mike Sullivan, attorney
 Pat McGuire, rancher
 Keith Goodenough, forester
 Al Hamburg, perennial candidate

Results

Republican Primary

Candidates
 Pete Simpson, former State Representative
 Bill Budd, former State Representative
 Fred Schroeder, former Chairman of the Republican Party of Wyoming
 Russ Donley, former Speaker of the Wyoming House of Representatives
 David R. Nicholas, State Senator
 John R. Johnson, dentist
 Jim L. Bace, computer programmer, 1982 Republican candidate for Governor

Results

Results

References

1986 Wyoming elections
1986
Wyoming
November 1986 events